The discography of MYMP, a Filipino acoustic band, consists of six studio albums, two live albums, one compilation album, one video album, and fifteen singles. The acoustic band had sold 285,700 album sales as of September 2009.

Albums

Studio albums

Live albums

Compilation albums

Singles

Other appearances
Senti Four It's Complicated (Viva Records & Vicor Music, 2010) - "Only Reminds Me"
May Bukas Pa album (Star Records, 2010) - "Nariyan Ka"
Tambayan 101.9 compilation album (Star Records,  2009) - "To Love You More"
Bagong Henerasyon: Bagong Himig (2009) - "Itaga Mo Sa Bato"
Acoustic's Best (Ivory Music, 2009) - "Get Me"
Soul Obsessions: Duets with Thor (Ivory Music, 2007) - "Be My Number Two"
Ultraelectromagneticjam!: The Music of the Eraserheads: A Tribute to the Eraserheads (Volume 1) (Sony Music, 2005) - "Huwag Mo Nang Itanong"
Jam88.3's Not Another Christmas Break (Sony Music, 2004) - "The Christmas Song"

Soundtracks and non-album songs
 "Peng You (Kaibigan)", with Kim Chiu (2006) (original version by Emil Chau)
 "Power of Two" (original version by Indigo Girls)
 "Think of Laura" (original version by Christopher Cross)
 "Sa'Yo" - Wave 89.1 recording, South Border tribute
 "Tatak Exclusibo" (2006) - HBC commercial song
 "Torpe Song #5 Remix" - Jollibee commercial
 "Bida ang Saya" - Jollibee store ad
 "One Moment, One Nescafe" - Nescafe ad (radio)
 "Jam88.3 Jingle" - Jam88.3 ad
 "Love Will Keep Us Together", George and Cecil
 "Friend of Mine", Close to You
 "A Little Bit", Can This Be Love
 "Sa Bawat Sandali", indie film
 "Di Na Nag-iisa", Darna theme (sung by Regine Velasquez)
 "Crazy for You" (original version by Madonna)
 "Baby Now That I've Found You" (original version by The Foundations)
 "Sway" (original version by Bic Runga)
 "Emotion" (original version by Samantha Sang)
 "Till They Take My Heart Away" (original version by Clair Marlo)
 "It Might Be You" (original version by Stephen Bishop)
 "A Very Special Love", Kailan (scene where Sarah and John sing together on karaoke)
 "Katorse", Tamis ng Unang Halik (original version by Kristina Paner)
 "I Love You, Goodbye" (for the film I Love You Goodbye) (original version by Celine Dion)

Video albums

References

Discographies of Filipino artists